The 2006–07 Scottish Junior Cup was a competition in Scottish Junior football. It was won for the third time by Linlithgow Rose after they defeated Kelty Hearts 2–1 in the final.

Under a new rule change, the Junior Cup winners (along with winners of the North, East and West regional leagues) qualify for the senior Scottish Cup; Linlithgow Rose therefore competed in the 2007–08 Scottish Cup.

First round
These ties were scheduled to take place on Saturday 30 September 2006.

Replays

Second round
These ties were scheduled to take place on Saturday 4 November 2006.

Replays

Third round
These ties were scheduled to take place on Saturday, 2 December 2006.

Replays

Fourth round
These ties were scheduled to take place on Saturday 13 January 2007.

Replays

Fifth round
These ties were scheduled to take place on Saturday 10 February 2007.

Quarter finals
These ties were played on Saturday 10 March 2007.

Semi-finals
These ties were played on 13 April and 20 April, respectively.

Final
The final took place on 3 June 2007.

Scottish Junior Cup seasons
Junior Cup